Rock Creek Park is a park in Washington, DC. It may also refer to:

 Rock Creek Park, Colorado, an unincorporated community and census-designated place
 Rock Creek Park Golf Course, Washington, DC
 "Rock Creek Park", a track from the album City Life by The Blackbyrds

See also
 Rock Creek State Park, Iowa